The Metropolitan School District of Mt. Vernon, Indiana, also known as simply the MSD of Mt. Vernon or MSDMV, is the school corporation serving the City of Mt. Vernon and southern Posey County and is the larger of two school districts in the county.  Four townships make up the district: Black, Lynn, Marrs and Point. The only incorporated community is Mount Vernon, Indiana, by far the largest community in the county.

The school district comprises five schools, Marrs Elementary, Farmersville Elementary, West Elementary, Mt. Vernon Junior High, Mt. Vernon High school. The district is led by Dr. Matthew Thompson

Schools
 Mount Vernon Senior High
Mount Vernon Junior High School
Farmersville Elementary School
Marrs Elementary School
West Elementary School

Other Facilities
 Southern Indiana Career & Technical Center
Hedges Central Community Center & Offices

Nearby districts
 Evansville-Vanderburgh School Corporation
 Metropolitan School District of North Posey County
 Union County Public Schools, Kentucky
 Carmi-White County Public Schools, Illinois

External links
Official site

Education in Posey County, Indiana
Mount Vernon and South Posey